Bucharest Film Studios (Media Pro Studios) in Romania is Eastern Europe's largest and longest established film studios with a tradition in cinema spanning almost 70 years. The complex is located in the town of Buftea, 20 kilometers north-west of Bucharest. Since they were founded (in the 1950s), over 600 films have been shot and processed there, both Romanian and international productions. 

In 2015, a group of investors from the U.S. and Romania finalized the transaction through which CME sold the shares to Media Pro Entertainment, a major shareholder of the Media Pro Studios. After a rebranding, Media Pro Studios is now Bucharest Film Studios.

Beginning
In the wake of Soviet control of Romania, the newly installed regime was quick to realize the propaganda potential of feature films. In 1950, construction began at what would later be called, using a terminology typical for that era, Centrul de Producţie Cinematografică Buftea (Buftea Film Production Center). Like any other business in a communist country, the studios were owned by the state and controlled by the Communist Party.

Although the studios were not fully finished until 1959, shooting began in the middle of the 1950s. At its completion, there were four stages, one set for mixed indoor-outdoor shooting, and a film processing lab. A single stage could store 30 limousines, as it did during a shooting for S-a furat o bombă ("A Bomb Has Been Stolen"), or could reproduce La Scala Opera Hall in Milan, used in the film Darcleé. Under the floor of the mixed indoor-outdoor set there was a water tank with crystal walls for underwater shootings.

Film production during the communist regime
From 1959 until 1989 the studios produced around twenty films per year. Films created during this period that won international acclaim at the Cannes Film Festival include: Scurtă istorie (A Short History) directed by Ion Popescu-Gopo, which won the Palme d'Or for Short Films in 1957; Pădurea spânzuraților (Forest of the Hanged) directed by Liviu Ciulei, who won the Best Director Award in 1965; Răscoala (Blazing Winter) directed by Mircea Mureșan, who won the Best First Work Award in 1966; Cântecele Renașterii (Renaissance Songs), a documentary about the Madrigal Choir directed by Mirel Ilieșiu, which won the Palme d'Or for Short Films in 1969.

Some of the most famous directors of Romanian cinema made their debuts at the Buftea Studios: Iulian Mihu and Manole Marcus – Viața nu iartă (Life Doesn't Spare), in 1959; Dan Pița – Nunta de piatră (The Stone Wedding), in 1972; Mircea Veroiu – Duhul aurului (Gold Fever), in 1974; Mircea Daneliuc – Cursa (The Long Drive), in 1975.

Due to good technical conditions provided by the Romanian studios, many international co-productions were shot at Buftea Studios before 1990. Ciulinii Bărăganului (Baragan Thistles), directed by Louis Daquin, Codine (Codeine) and Steaua fără nume (Nameless Star), both directed by Henri Colpi, Serbările galante (The Lace Wars), directed by René Clair, Dacii (The Dacians), directed by Sergiu Nicolaescu or Columna (The Column), directed by Mircea Drăgan, are only a few examples.

Transition to the market economy
After the fall of the communist regime (the Romanian Revolution of 1989) the studios suffered heavily from lack of funding. Film production dramatically diminished and the number of theaters that stayed open was in freefall. However, Romanian film directors managed to make their voice heard in international festivals once again: Dan Piţa was awarded the Silver Lion at the Venice Film Festival in 1992 (for Hotel de lux – Hotel Deluxe) and Lucian Pintilie was awarded the Special Grand Prize of the Jury at the same festival in 1998 (for Terminus Paradis).

Like the entire Romanian economy, the Buftea Studios entered a recession period. The government reduced funding the film industry during this period. Thus, the late 1990s found the Buftea Studios on the verge of bankruptcy.

New beginning
In 1998 the Studios were purchased at a public auction by Media Pro Group. It took more than a year of intensive renovation to bring back to life all the production facilities. Media Pro Studios has 19 stages, the largest water tank in Eastern Europe, a backlot (including a lake), more than 30,000 costumes from all historical periods, and exterior sets from the 16th to 18th century.

The first important production after 1998 was in 2000. Costa Gavras' Amen reestablished the reputation of Media Pro Studios and opened the way for more than 50 international productions.
In the following years, some international filmmakers such as Franco Zeffirelli, Jeremy Irons, Sissy Spacek, Donald Sutherland, Andy García, Dennis Hopper, Fanny Ardant, Robert Carlyle, Dolph Lundgren or Bob Hoskins set foot in the studios and contributed to international productions, features, and TV films. Joyeux Noël (Merry Christmas), French nominee at the Academy Awards and Golden Globes, Sex Traffic, which won 9 BAFTA awards, The Cave, a science fiction horror film and An American Haunting are some of the titles shot in the studios.

In autumn 2006 three new Romanian titles entered the theaters: Margo, directed by Ioan Cărmăzan, Lacrimi de iubire (Tears of Love) – the first Romanian spin-off –, and Trei fraţi de belea (Three Loony Brothers) – from the authors of the number one film in local box-office after 1990, Garcea şi oltenii (Garcea, the Stupidest Policeman on Earth).

In 2007, California Dreaming (endless), a Media Pro Pictures production directed by Cristian Nemescu, received Un certain regard Prix at Cannes Film Festival.

In recent years, Media Pro Studios has diversified its range of services to include television. Working with the TV stations co-owned by Adrian Sârbu and Central European Media (Pro TV and Acasă), Media Pro Studios and its sister company, Media Pro Pictures, produced the first local sitcom, Neighbors Forever, 2002, as well as the first local soap opera (Only Love, 2004). Neighbors Forever has been on the air for 10 seasons which is a record in Romanian television.

Their television production portfolio also includes other soap operas and sitcoms, a police series, and dozens of TV films. Studio officials claim that in 2006 alone about 1,000 hours of fiction were produced for television.

The services provided by the studios also include the shooting of television commercials and event management.

Since 2009, with the integration of Media Pro Entertainment within Central European Media Enterprises, Media Pro Studios is servicing original content production for six countries, dozens of CME broadcasters and distribution as well as receiving commissions from third party broadcasters. It is able to offer full production services to the international film industry.

Taking advantage of the region's abundance of talent in the field, Media Pro Entertainment was the first to create a coherent entity integrating cutting-edge CGI / VFX technology and content into the production and post-production work flow and facilities. Media Pro Magic is now one of the leading VFX and Post-production houses in the region.

Present day
In 2015, a group of investors – formed by important film producers from the US and Romania – has finalized the transaction through which CME sold the shares of MediaPro Entertainment, major shareholder of the Media Pro Studios. Following a rebranding operation, Media Pro Studios became Studiourile Buftea.

Notable films

1950s
La Moara cu noroc (1956);
Citadela sfarâmată (1957);
Două lozuri (1957);
Ciulinii Bărăganului (1957);
Alo?... Aţi greşit numărul! (1958);
Viaţa nu iartă (1959);
Telegrame (1959);
Valurile Dunării (1959).

1960s
Darclée (1960);
Setea (1960);
Codine (1962);
Tudor (1962);
Pădurea spânzuraţilor (1964);
Titanic vals (1964);
Duminică la ora şase (1965);
Răscoala (1965);
Les fêtes galantes (1965);
Mona, l'étoile sans nom (1966);
Dacii (1966);
Dimineţile unui băiat cuminte (1966);
Sept hommes et une garce (1966);
Kampf um Rom II – Der Verrat (1968);
Columna (1968);
Reconstituirea (1969).

1970s
Mihai Viteazul (movie) (1970);
Felix şi Otilia (1972);
Cu mâinile curate (1972);
Astă-seară dansăm în familie (1972);
Ştefan cel Mare, Vaslui 1475 (1974);
Dincolo de pod (1975);
Mere roșii (1975);
Operaţiunea "Monstrul" (1976);
Mama (1977);
Profetul, aurul şi ardelenii (1978);
Blestemul pământului, blestemul iubirii (1979).

1980s
Pruncul, petrolul şi ardelenii (1981);
Secvenţe (1982);
Concurs (1982);
Faleze de nisip (1982);
De ce trag clopotele, Mitică? (1982);
Buletin de București (1982);
Pas în doi (1985);
Glissando (1985);
Vară sentimentală (1985);
Moromeţii (1988);
Noiembrie, ultimul bal (1989);
Balanţa.

1990s
Rămânerea (1992);
Hotel de lux (1992);
Patul conjugal (1993);
Asfalt tango (1993);
O vară de neuitat (1994);
Terminus paradis (1998).

2000s
Callas Forever (2001);
Amen (2002);
Furia (2002);
Second Hand (2002);
Filantropica (2002);
Gunpowder, Treason and Plot (2003);
Sex Traffic (TV, 2004);
The Last Drop (2004);
Modigliani (2004);
The Cave (2004);
Blood and Chocolate (2005);
Joyeux Noël (2005);
An American Haunting (2006);
California Dreaming (2006);
Bunraku (2008)
Fire and Ice: The Dragon Chronicles (2008)
Perkins'14 (2008)
Slaughter (2008)
Creature (2008)
Hellhounds (2008)
Sand Serpents (2008)
Alien Western (2008)
Ces amours-là (2009)
The Devil inside (2009)

2010s
Christopher Roth (2010)
Whistleblower (2010)
Christmas at Castlebury Hal (2011)
William & Kate: A Royal Love Story (2011)
Assassination Games (2011)
One in the Chamber (2011)
The devil inside (2011)
Six Bullets (2011)
The Timber (2012)
WER (2012)
The Zero Theorem (2012)
The Necessary death of Charlie Countryman (2012)
The Keeping room (2013)
Bathory (2013)
Deus Ex Machina (2014)
Chosen (2014)

2020s
Wednesday (2022)

References

External links
The website of the Cannes Film Festival
The Internet Movie Database
Studiourile Buftea website
 Study of the audiovisual landscape and public audiovisual policies in Romania by IMCA for the European Commission, March 2004, p. 18. Describes the place of MediaPro within the Romanian arts world.

Film production companies of Romania
Companies established in the 1950s
Ilfov County
Mass media in Buftea